, sometimes stylized as ASUKA, is the ring name of a Japanese professional wrestler. She is currently working as a freelancer and is best known for being with other wrestling promotions such as Pro Wrestling Wave and Seadlinnng.

Professional wrestling career

Independent circuit (2015–present)
Asuka participated in a 50-person gauntlet match at OZ Academy/Manami Toyota Produce Manami Toyota 30th Anniversary, Manami Toyota's retirement show produced by Oz Academy on November 3, 2017, where she was the 19th person to get eliminated. She participated at ZERO1 Dream Series: Sozo no Jin, an event promoted by Pro Wrestling Zero1 on March 4, 2018, where she teamed up with Takuya Sugawara to unsuccessfully challenge Masamune and Sugi for the NWA International Lightweight Tag Team Championship. At Grow Together! 2021, an event promoted by Seadlinnng from March 17, Asuka defeated Rina Yamashita to win the vacant Beyond the Sea Single Championship. At ZERO1 20th Anniversary Series: Believe 'Z' Road from February 7, Asuka unsuccessfully challenged El Lindaman for both Zero1 World Junior Heavyweight Championship and Zero1 International Junior Heavyweight Championship. Asuka participated at WRESTLE-1 Tour 2019 W-Impact, an event produced by Wrestle-1 on February 13, where she teamed up with Hana Kimura as FloÜrish to defeat Kaori Yoneyama and Miyuki Takase.

DDT Pro-Wrestling (2019–2020)
At Sweet Dreams 2019 on January 27, she won the Ironman Heavymetalweight Championship competing in a 8-man battle royal also involving Chinsuke Nakamura, Kazuki Hirata, Kazusada Higuchi, Keisuke Okuda, Kikutaro, Toru Owashi and Yuki Iino. At the Ganbare☆Pro-Wrestling event Cliffhanger 2021 on February 21, Asuka teamed up with Hagane Shinno and Shinichiro Tominaga to defeat Dreams Haru True (Keisuke Ishii, Kouki Iwasaki and Harukaze) for the GWC 6-Man Tag Team Championship. At Heaven's Door 2020 on August 22, Asuka defeated Hagane Shinno to win the Independent World Junior Heavyweight Championship.

Pro Wrestling Wave (2015–2018)
Asuka made her debut as a professional wrestler in Pro Wrestling Wave on August 9, 2015 in a losing effort to Yuu Yamagata. She participated in the Catch the Wave tournament in 2016, competing in the Mandarin Orange block against Dash Chisako, Yuki Miyazaki and Hibiscus Mii, finishing with two points. Asuka competed at the Hana Kimura Produce HANA on August 7, 2016, where she teamed with Masato Inaba and Super Delfin to defeat Abdullah Kobayashi, Hayate and Kyoko Kimura in a six-person tag team match. Asuka participated in the Catch The Wave 2018 Tournament, competing in the Crazy Block against Rina Yamashita, Nagisa Nozaki, Ryo Mizunami, Yumi Ohka and Miyuki Takase, finishing with a total of three points, and receiving a technique award due to competing while injured. Asuka won the Wave Single Championship at WAVE Anivarsario WAVE 2018 on August 19, where she defeated Takumi Iroha.

All Elite Wrestling (2021)
On February 3, 2021, at Beach Break, she was announced as a participant in the AEW Women's World Championship Eliminator Tournament under the ring name Veny (stylized in all capital letters). She lost to Emi Sakura in the first round which aired on February 15. On February 28, 2021, she teamed up with Maki Itoh and Emi Sakura in a losing effort to Hikaru Shida, Mei Suruga and Rin Kadokura in a six-person tag team match.

Personal life
Asuka is the first known transgender professional wrestler from Japan. Firstly she came out as gay to her father at the age of 16 and later dropped out of high school to pursue a professional wrestling career.

Championships and accomplishments 
 DDT Pro-Wrestling
GWC 6-Man Tag Team Championship (1 time) – with Hagane Shinno and Shinichiro Tominaga
 Independent World Junior Heavyweight Championship (1 time)
 Ironman Heavymetalweight Championship (3 times)
 KO-D 10-Man Tag Team Championship (1 time) – with Danshoku Dino, Mizuki, Trans-Am★Hiroshi, and Yuki Iino
 KO-D Tag Team Championship (1 time) – with Mao
 Pro Wrestling Illustrated
Ranked No. 367 of the top 500 singles wrestlers in the PWI 500 in 2022
Ranked No. 56 of the top 150 female singles wrestlers in the PWI Women's 50 in 2021
 Pro Wrestling Wave
 Wave Single Championship (1 time)
 Catch the Wave 2018 Technique Award
 Seadlinnng
 Beyond the Sea Single Championship (1 time)
 Beyond the Sea Tag Team Championship (2 times, current) – with Makoto
Sendai Girls' Pro Wrestling
 Sendai Girls World Championship (1 time, current)
 World Woman Pro-Wrestling Diana'''
 World Woman Pro-Wrestling Diana World Championship (1 time)

References

External links 
  
  
 

1998 births
Living people
Japanese non-binary professional wrestlers
LGBT professional wrestlers
Japanese LGBT sportspeople
Sportspeople from Yokohama
Transgender sportspeople
21st-century Japanese LGBT people
Transgender non-binary people
Non-binary sportspeople
Independent World Junior Heavyweight Champions
Ironman Heavymetalweight Champions
KO-D 8-Man/10-Man Tag Team Champions
KO-D Tag Team Champions